Silencio (Portuguese or Spanish for "silence") may refer to:

Music
 "Silencio" (Rafael Hernández song), 1932 bolero by Rafael Hernández
 "Silencio", a 1953 song by Celia Cruz & La Sonora Matancera
 "Silencio" (David Bisbal song), from the 2006 studio album, Premonición
 "Silencio" (Nelly Furtado song), from the 2009 studio album, Mi Plan

Film and TV
 Club Silencio, a fictional club in the 2001 film Mulholland Drive
 Lake Silencio, a fictional lake in the Doctor Who episodes "The Impossible Astronaut" and "The Wedding of River Song"
 Silencio, a luchador character of Kenny Hotz

See also
 Silence, the relative or total lack of audible sound
 Silence (disambiguation)
 El Silencio (disambiguation)